Kayla Imrie (born 4 February 1992) is a New Zealand canoeist.

She represented New Zealand at the 2016 Summer Olympics. She competed alongside Jaimee Lovett, Caitlin Ryan and Aimee Fisher in the Women's K-4 500 metres event. After having trained together for just 18 months, the young crew achieved a fifth place in the medal race.

Of Māori descent, Imrie affiliates to Whakatōhea.

References

External links

1992 births
Living people
Olympic canoeists of New Zealand
Canoeists at the 2016 Summer Olympics
New Zealand female canoeists
New Zealand Māori sportspeople
Whakatōhea people
ICF Canoe Sprint World Championships medalists in kayak
Sportspeople from Wellington City